"Bad Mood" is a song from English indie rock band the Vaccines. The track was released in the United Kingdom on 17 March 2013 as the fourth and final single from the band's second studio album, Come of Age (2012).

Track listing

Charts

Release history

References

2012 songs
2013 singles
Columbia Records singles
The Vaccines songs